The Interstate Highways in Arizona are the segments of the Dwight D. Eisenhower System of Interstate and Defense Highways that are owned and maintained by the U.S. state of Arizona, totaling about . Arizona has a total of six Interstate Highways, all of which are mainline highways; there are no auxiliary highways. The longest Interstate in Arizona is Interstate 10 (I-10), which traverses east-west through the southern and central parts of the state, serving Phoenix. There are also a total of fourteen active business routes and eight former routes, which were either business loops or spurs for all main highways except I-15. All of Arizona's existing Interstate Highways have overtaken or replaced some U.S. Routes, which either involved decommissioning or running concurrent with the existing route. 

The Arizona Department of Transportation (ADOT) is the agency responsible for building and maintaining the Interstate Highways in the Arizona State Highway System. These highways are built to Interstate Highway standards, which are freeways that have a  speed limit in rural areas and a  speed limit in urban areas. The numbering scheme used to designate the Interstates was developed by the American Association of State Highway and Transportation Officials (AASHTO), an organization composed of various state departments of transportation in the United States.

Description
There are no auxiliary interstates within the state, which are three-digit routes. The only auxiliary Interstate that has existed in Arizona was I-410, which was an inner loop route in Phoenix. It later became part of I-10 as I-10 was rerouted and the old route became part of I-17. I-11 is a proposed Interstate that is currently in its planning phase and is expected to run from the Hoover Dam to Nogales. It is planned to overtake U.S. Route 93 (US 93).
There are also 14 active business routes within the state. All current Interstate Highways have had business routes except for I-15, which never had a business route designated. I-17's only business route located in Black Canyon City was decommissioned in 2011, joining I-15 as the only two routes without a business route.

List

Business routes
All state designated Interstate Business Loops are internally designated as State Route Business Loops by ADOT, being referred to throughout ADOT ArcGIS data and state highway logs as such. For example, all currently state designated I-10 Business Loops in Arizona are referred to as "SB010" which is the Arizona Transportation Information System (ATIS) code for "State Business Route 10" or "SR 10B" for short.

See also

Notes

References

Interstate Highways in Arizona
Interstate